The inverted spectrum is the hypothetical concept, pertaining to the philosophy of color, of two people sharing their color vocabulary and discriminations, although the colors one sees—one's qualia—are systematically different from the colors the other person sees.

Overview

The concept dates back to John Locke. It invites us to imagine that we wake up one morning, and find that for some unknown reason all the colors in the world have been inverted, i.e. swapped to the hue on the opposite side of a color wheel, the complementary color. Furthermore, we discover that no physical changes have occurred in our brains or bodies that would explain this phenomenon. Supporters of the hypothesis of qualia as non-physical entities argue that, since we can imagine this happening without contradiction, it follows that we are imagining a change in a property that determines the way things look to us, but that has no physical basis. In more detail:

Metaphysical identity holds of necessity
If something is possibly false, it is not necessary
It is conceivable that qualia could have a different relationship to physical brain-states
If it is conceivable, then it is possible
Since it is possible for qualia to have a different relationship with physical brain-states, they cannot be identical to brain states (by 1).
Therefore, qualia are non-physical.

The argument thus states that if we find the inverted spectrum plausible, we must admit that qualia exist (and are non-physical). Some philosophers find it absurd that an "armchair argument" can prove something to exist, and the detailed argument does involve many assumptions about conceivability and possibility, which are open to criticism. Perhaps it is not possible for a given brain state to produce anything other than a given quale in our universe, and that is all that matters. The question, however, can arise how these critical philosophers, using the same armchair technique that they are criticizing, refute the robust argumentation of the Inverted spectrum experiment?

C. L. Hardin criticizes the idea that an inverted spectrum would be undetectable on scientific grounds:

Paul Churchland using the Hurvich–Jameson (H–J) opponent process criticizes the inverted spectrum on scientific grounds:

In some cases, the inverted spectrum scenario is clearly possible. For example, if a world is simulated on a computer and we are looking at this world on a screen, perhaps through the eyes of one of the characters in the simulation, then clearly it is possible to invert the spectrum from our perspective. This is because some small changes to the code used for displaying the world would make it so that it would display in red what was displayed in green before, etc., without changing the underlying simulated physics. Though this would entail that code on a computer which represents a creature with sight is equivalent with a creature with sight. It is not clear whether we can conclude from such examples that an inverted spectrum is possible in ordinary life.

Inverted spectrum arguments have applications to behavioralism, physicalism, representationalism, functionalism, skepticism and the hard problem of consciousness.

In his book I Am a Strange Loop, Douglas Hofstadter argues that the inverted spectrum argument entails a form of solipsism in which people can have no idea about what goes on in the minds of others—contrary to the central theme of his work. He presents several variants to demonstrate the absurdity of this idea: the "inverted political spectrum", in which one person's concept of liberty is identical to another's concept of imprisonment; an inverted "sonic spectrum" in which low musical notes sound like "high" ones and vice versa (which he says is impossible because low sounds can be felt physically as vibrations); and a version in which random, complex qualia such as riding a roller coaster or opening presents are reversed, so that everyone perceives the world in radically different, unknowable ways.

See also
Dualism (philosophy of mind)
Functionalism
Further facts
Mary's room
Ontological argument
Philosophical zombies
Philosophy of color
Philosophy of mind
Philosophy of perception
Physicalism
Qualia
Subjective character of experience
The map is not the territory

Notes

External links
Stanford Encyclopedia of Philosophy
David Cole

Color
Thought experiments in philosophy